Latham is a village in Logan County, Illinois, United States. The population was 380 at the 2010 census.

History
Latham was platted in 1871 and named in honor of Robert B. Latham, a railroad official. A post office called Latham has been in operation since 1872.

Geography
Latham is located in southeastern Logan County.

Demographics

As of the census of 2000, there were 371 people, 157 households, and 107 families residing in the village. The racial makeup of the village was 99.73% White and 0.27% Native American.

There were 157 households, out of which 29.3% had children under the age of 18 living with them, 57.3% were married couples living together, 6.4% had a female householder with no husband present, and 31.8% were non-families. 27.4% of all households were made up of individuals, and 12.7% had someone living alone who was 65 years of age or older. The average household size was 2.36 and the average family size was 2.88.

In the village, the age distribution of the population shows 24.3% under the age of 18, 8.9% from 18 to 24, 27.8% from 25 to 44, 27.5% from 45 to 64, and 11.6% who were 65 years of age or older. The median age was 36 years. For every 100 females, there were 101.6 males. For every 100 females age 18 and over, there were 100.7 males.

The median income for a household in the village was $43,750, and the median income for a family was $47,292. Males had a median income of $36,500 versus $22,500 for females. The per capita income for the village was $16,917. About 12.4% of families and 12.9% of the population were below the poverty line, including 22.0% of those under age 18 and 7.4% of those age 65 or over.

Notable people

 Chad Gray, (b. 1971) singer in heavy metal band Mudvayne; born in Latham
 Eugene Earl "Junior" Thompson, (1917 - 2006) pitcher for the Cincinnati Reds and New York Giants; born in Latham

References

Villages in Logan County, Illinois
Villages in Illinois